Kakua Union is a union of Tangail Sadar Upazila, Tangail District, Bangladesh.

Demographics
According to the 2011 Bangladesh census, Kakua Union had 5,614 households and a population of 27,260. The literacy rate (age 7 and over) was 31.8% (male: 35.4%, female: 28%).

See also
 Union Councils of Tangail District

References

Populated places in Tangail District
Unions of Tangail Sadar Upazila